The 1968 Harvard Crimson football team was an American football team that represented Harvard University during the 1968 NCAA University Division football season. Harvard was co-champion of the Ivy League.

In their 12th year under head coach John Yovicsin, the Crimson compiled an 8–0–1 record and outscored opponents 236 to 90. Vic Gatto was the team captain.

Both Harvard and Yale were unbeaten entering their season-ending rivalry matchup. Their 29–29 tie resulted in identical 6–0–1 conference records, and in both teams being named co-champions of the league. The Crimson outscored Ivy opponents 150 to 70. The final game inspired The Harvard Crimson headline "Harvard Beats Yale 29-29", and a 2008 documentary film of the same name.

Harvard played its home games at Harvard Stadium in the Allston neighborhood of Boston, Massachusetts.

Actor Tommy Lee Jones was a starting guard on the team.

Schedule

Awards
All-Ivy League 1st team
 Tom Jones – Guard
 Vic Gatto – Running back
 Pete Hall – Defensive end
 John Emery – Linebacker
 Pat Conway – Defensive back
 Gary Singletary – Punter

References

Harvard
Harvard Crimson football seasons
Ivy League football champion seasons
College football undefeated seasons
Harvard Crimson football
1960s in Boston